Graphidium is a monotypic genus of nematodes belonging to the family Trichostrongylidae. The only species is Graphidium strigosum.

The species is found in Europe, Southern America.

References

Trichostrongylidae
Nematode genera
Monotypic animal genera